Andrej Magdevski (born January 14, 1996) is a Macedonian professional basketball player who plays for Donar of the BNXT League. He plays as point guard.

Career
After playing in the youth teams of Partizan and Real Madrid, in Summer 2014 Magdevski signed for Unicaja Málaga, who loaned him to Clínicas Rincón Axarquía of the LEB Oro.

On September 29, 2015, he returned to Partizan.

On September 23, 2016, he signed with the Macedonian club Feni Industries. On August 20, 2017, he re-signed with Feni Industries. On January 10, 2018, he signed with Gostivar.

On August 4, 2018, he signed with MZT Skopje.

Magdevski joined Donar of the Dutch BNXT League in November 2022, where he replaced Charles Callison as the team's foreign point guard. He made his debut on 11 December in a 72–69 home win over Landstede Hammers, and scored ten points for Donar.

Macedonia national team
Magdevski made his debut for the Macedonia national team at the FIBA EuroBasket 2015 qualification, where he played six games averaging 3.8 points and 16.5 minutes.

References

External links
 Andrej Magdevski at aba-liga.com
 Andrej Magdevski at euroleague.net
 Andrej Magdevski at competiciones.feb.es
 Andrej Magdevski at regeneracomsports.com
 Andrej Magdevski at fiba.com

Living people
1996 births
Macedonian expatriate basketball people in Serbia
Macedonian men's basketball players
KK Partizan players
OKK Beograd players
Sportspeople from Skopje
CB Axarquía players
KK MZT Skopje players
Point guards

Donar (basketball club) players